CDFS may refer to:
 CDfs, a Linux virtual file system
 cdfs, a Plan 9 user-space program, is also covered by the above article.
 Compact Disc File System, or ISO 9660
 CDFS, an acronym in electrical engineering that has the meaning of inquiring the status of the Schematic completion from the DCM entity (Cand Dracului Faci Schema).
 Chandra Deep Field South, a region of the sky where the deepest astronomical observations by the Chandra X-ray Observatory have been made